Tom Christensen (born 13 September 1949) is a former tennis player from Denmark.

Tennis career
Christensen was a regular member of the Denmark Davis Cup team throughout the 1970s, making his debut in 1972 against Finland during the Europe Zone first round tie. During his Davis Cup career, he won 5 of the 13 singles matches and 7 of the 8 doubles matches that he played.

See also
List of Denmark Davis Cup team representatives

References

External links

1949 births
Living people
Danish male tennis players